Choi Ho (1967) is a South Korean film director and screenwriter. Choi is known for his films, notably, Bye June (1998), Bloody Tie (2006), Go Go 70s (2008) and Big Match (2014).

Filmography

As director 
Opening the Closed School Gates (1992)
Young Lover (1994)
Bye June (1998)
Who R. U.? (2002)
Bloody Tie (2006)
Go Go 70s (2008)
Big Match (2014)

As screenwriter 
Bye June (1998)
Who R. U.? (2002)
Bloody Tie (2006)
Go Go 70s (2008)
Big Match (2014)

As script editor 
Bye June (1998)

References

External links 
 
 
 

1967 births
Living people
South Korean film directors
South Korean screenwriters
Chung-Ang University alumni
People from Seoul